Bauccio Commons is a dining hall and community space on the University of Portland campus in Portland, Oregon, United States. It was renovated in 2009, renamed in honor of Fedele Bauccio in 2010, and renovated again in 2017.

References

Buildings and structures in Portland, Oregon
University of Portland campus